Gehyra koira is a species of gecko in the genus Gehyra, endemic to Western Australia and the Northern Territory.

References

Gehyra
Reptiles described in 2005
Geckos of Australia